Malcolm Spellman is an American screenwriter and producer best known for his work on Empire (2015) and The Falcon and the Winter Soldier (2021).

Career
In March 2010, Spellman started his career by writing the screenplay for the film Our Family Wedding (2010). In February 2015, Spellman began writing for television by scripting several episodes of the television series Empire (2015). In October 2015, Spellman and Carlito Rodriguez were hired by Warner Bros. to write the script for a Sylvia Robinson film biopic. In October 2018, it was announced that Warner Bros. was still moving forward with the film and Spellman and Rodriguez had been joined by Tracy Oliver in completing the script. In July 2017, Spellman was producing the HBO series Confederate.

In December 2019, he served as a producer on the Apple TV+ series Truth Be Told (2019). In February 2021, Spellman served as an executive producer on the FX series Hip Hop Uncovered (2021). In March 2021, he gained notability from serving as showrunner on the Disney+ series The Falcon and the Winter Soldier (2021), set in the Marvel Cinematic Universe (MCU). In December 2021, he served as writer and executive producer on the 2022 revival series Bel-Air. He is set to co-write Captain America: New World Order in the MCU, with Dalan Musson. In October 2022, it was revealed that Spellman would write the upcoming Spawn film alongside Scott Silver and Matthew Mixon.

Filmography

References

External links
 

21st-century American male writers
21st-century American screenwriters
American male screenwriters
American male television writers
American television writers
Living people
Place of birth missing (living people)
Showrunners
Year of birth missing (living people)